Muhammad Ali vs. Brian London was a professional boxing matching between Muhammad Ali and Brian London. The match took place at Earls Court Arena, London, England on August 6, 1966. It was scheduled for fifteen rounds. The match ended in the third round with Ali defeating London by KO.

The fight
Ali at 24 years old put on a masterful performance against a clearly out-classed 32 year old opponent, with Ali having the advantages of height, weight, reach and youth on his side, almost hitting London at will as the fight went on. As London put it in an interview with the BBC: "he was just getting through all the time". 

Ali bouncingly circled continually, whilst London tracked doggedly after him for the first two rounds seemingly with a strategy of trying to land a single knock-out punch to the American champion. London succeeded in landing only one blow in the match, a left jab to Ali's jaw midway through the 1st Round which caught Ali by surprise and left him for a moment stunned (and wide-open for a follow through right cross, which London failed to take advantage of), but the blow lacked weight and Ali was able to quickly recover. 

On coming out for the 3rd Round London displayed a patent degree of hesitation to come forward to engage, and Ali sensing this advanced to the attack flashly, penning him back into a corner and throwing a 12-punch combination in 3 seconds in a showboating display of speed and athleticism, but with a suspicion of Ali holding back, with few of the blows actually connecting or possessing weight behind them, and the one blow that did (the 10th) being just enough to knock London down and end the fight.  

In a post-career media interview London described his contest with Ali in stark terms, describing Ali as being:-"Big, fast and he could punch, whereas I was smaller, fatter and couldn't punch. He stopped me in three rounds and that was it, I don't think I hit him. It was good money and I got well paid for it - that's all I fought for. Every fight I ever had I always had a go, but with Muhammad Ali I thought don't get hurt Brian, and I therefore didn't try, which was wrong, totally wrong."

References

London
1966 in boxing
World Boxing Council heavyweight championship matches
August 1966 sports events in the United Kingdom